José Gabriel Madonia (born 1 June 1977) is a Venezuelan actor and model.

Biography
He began his modelling career by participating in the 1999 edition of Mister Venezuela where he became Second Runner Up. He was then sent to Singapore to compete in the Manhunt International pageant.

In 2012, he joined the cast of the telenovela Válgame Dios where he played a chef named Guto.

Madonia has also participated in several theater productions. In 2013, he joined renowned actresses Astrid Carolina Herrera and Hilda Abrahamz in the stage play titled Tres.

Telenovelas

Theater
 Cuidado Simoncito está soñando
 Tres
 Amigos Tres Leches
 Se abrió la jaula

References

External links
 
 José Gabriel Madonía: Un seductor actor que conquista Venezuela at 
 JOSÉ MADONIA TRIUNFÓ EN ARUBA at 

1977 births
Male actors from Caracas
Male beauty pageant winners
Venezuelan male models
Venezuelan male stage actors
Venezuelan male telenovela actors
Living people